Roger Federer defeated David Ferrer in the final, 6–3, 1–6, 6–2 to win the men's singles tennis title at the 2014 Cincinnati Masters. It was his sixth Cincinnati Masters title.

Rafael Nadal was the reigning champion, but withdrew due to a right wrist injury.

Seeds
The top eight seeds receive a bye into the second round.

 Novak Djokovic (third round)
 Roger Federer (champion)
 Stan Wawrinka (quarterfinals)
 Tomáš Berdych (second round)
 Milos Raonic (semifinals)
 David Ferrer (final)
 Grigor Dimitrov (second round)
 Andy Murray (quarterfinals)
 Ernests Gulbis (second round)
 Richard Gasquet (withdrew due to abdominal injury)
 John Isner (third round)
 Jo-Wilfried Tsonga (first round)
 Roberto Bautista Agut (second round)
 Marin Čilić (third round)
 Fabio Fognini (quarterfinals)
 Tommy Robredo (quarterfinals)

Draw

Finals

Top half

Section 1

Section 2

Bottom half

Section 3

Section 4

Qualifying

Seeds

 Benjamin Becker (qualified)
 Marinko Matosevic (qualified)
 Teymuraz Gabashvili (qualified)
 Nick Kyrgios (withdrew due to left forearm injury)
 Bernard Tomic (qualified)
 Tobias Kamke (first round)
 Blaž Rola (qualifying competition, Lucky loser)
 Adrian Mannarino (qualifying competition)
 Paul-Henri Mathieu (qualifying competition)
 Matthew Ebden (qualifying competition)
 'Benoît Paire (qualified)
 Alejandro González (qualifying competition) Malek Jaziri (qualifying competition) Tim Smyczek (qualifying competition)''

Qualifiers

Lucky loser

Qualifying draw

First qualifier

Second qualifier

Third qualifier

Fourth qualifier

Fifth qualifier

Sixth qualifier

Seventh qualifier

References
Main draw
Qualifying draw

Men's Singles